Now Is the Hour may refer to:

 Now Is the Hour (song), a popular folk song
 Now Is the Hour (Charlie Haden album), 1995
 Now Is the Hour (Jennifer Rush album), 2010
 Now Is the Hour (Deane Waretini album), 2012
 Now Is the Hour (TV series), a 2012 New Zealand mockumentary television series